Molentargius - Saline Regional Park (Italian: Parco naturale regionale Molentargius - Saline) is a regional park in Sardinia, Italy. It was established in 1999  with the aim to protect and enhance a site of international interest, already included in the Ramsar Convention since 1977 because of its number relevance about stopover, wintering and nesting waterfowl bird species.

Molentargius in Sardinian language means "donkeys handlers", as the salt extraction was the richest industry of the Cagliari area for millennia,  the salt being transported by  donkeys. The park is a wetland extending over an area of about 1600 hectares surrounded by the urbanized areas of Cagliari and the other towns of the metropolitan area, and the waterfront of Poetto beach. 

The uniqueness of this area is the presence of reservoirs of both freshwater and saltwater, separated by a plain characterized by prevailing aridity called Is Arenas ("The sands"). Areas with fresh water are the ponds of Bellarosa Minore and Perdalonga, born as expansion of rainwater tanks. Areas of salt water ponds include the production system of the former Statal Saline of Cagliari, consisting of the Bellarosa Maggiore or Is Molentargius (water storage tank evaporation), by the Pond of Quartu (second and third tanks evaporation), the other salting basins (saline of Cagliari).

From 1850 to the present,  230 bird species, belonging to 53 families have been recorded in the Molentargius area.

References

External links
Official website 

Parks in Sardinia
Regional parks of Italy
Ramsar sites in Italy
Protected areas established in 1999
1999 establishments in Italy